Katja Tengel (born 27 June 1981 as Katja Wakan in Eisleben, Saxony-Anhalt) is a German sprinter who specializes in the 100 metres.

At the 2003 World Championships she finished seventh in the 4x100 m relay, together with teammates Melanie Paschke, Marion Wagner and Sandra Möller. At the 2007 World Championships she finished seventh in the relay, together with teammates Cathleen Tschirch, Johanna Kedzierski and Verena Sailer.

Her personal best time on the individual distance is 11.37 seconds, achieved in June 2006 in Regensburg. She has 23.94 seconds in the 200 metres.

References
 

1981 births
Living people
German female sprinters
Athletes (track and field) at the 2004 Summer Olympics
Olympic athletes of Germany
People from Eisleben
Olympic female sprinters
Sportspeople from Saxony-Anhalt